Pseudoips is a genus of nolid moths in the family Nolidae. There are about six described species in Pseudoips, found mainly in Europe and Eastern Asia.

Species
These six species belong to the genus Pseudoips:
 Pseudoips amarilla Draudt, 1950
 Pseudoips erenkophila Bryk, 1942
 Pseudoips nereida Draudt, 1950
 Pseudoips prasinana (Linnaeus, 1758) (green silver-lines)
 Pseudoips sylpha Butler, 1879
 Pseudoips sylphina Sugi, 1992

References

Further reading

 

Chloephorinae
Taxa named by Jacob Hübner